Vriesea recurvata is a plant species in the genus Vriesea. This species is endemic to Brazil.

Cultivars
 Vriesea 'Yara'

References

BSI Cultivar Registry Retrieved 11 October 2009

recurvata
Flora of Brazil